"I'll Sail My Ship Alone" is a 1950 song written by Moon Mullican (sometimes credited as "Morry Burns"), Henry Bernard (sometimes credited as "Henry Glover"), Lois Mann (sometimes credited as "Sydney Nathan") and Henry Thurston, and popularized by Moon Mullican.

Chart performance
The song was Mullican's most successful release, reaching number one on the Billboard Country & Western chart for a single week, and spending a total of nine months on that listing.  "I'll Sail My Ship Alone" crossed over to the pop chart, reaching number 17.

Other recordings
Patsy Cline recorded this song on her last recording session, before she died in a plane crash. 
It was recorded by Jerry Lee Lewis in 1958.
Hank Williams 
Skeets McDonald
Tiny Hill
Ferlin Husky
George Jones
Slim Whitman
Patrick Wall
Mickey Gilley 
Leon Russell (as "Hank Wilson").

References

 
 

 

1950 singles
Moon Mullican songs
Tiny Hill songs
Songs written by Syd Nathan
1950 songs
Songs written by Henry Glover